Malayidomthuruth (also written as Malayidam Thuruthu) is a town in Kizhakkambalam panchayath near city of Kochi, India. Malayidomthuruth is where road from Oorakkad and Thamarachal make a junction on road from Pukkattupadi to Chembarakky.

Organizations
 Malayidom Thuruth Service Co-operative Society 
 Malayidom Thuruth Service Co-operative Bank
 Malayidomthuruth Police Station
 Malayidomthuruth Government LP School

Religious places
 St. Mary's Jacobite Syrian Church, Malayidomthuruth
 St. George Chapel, Malayidomthuruth
 Muhiyadheen Juma Masjid, Malayidomthuruth

Hospitals
 Primary Health Centre, Malayidamthuruth

Location

References 

Cities and towns in Ernakulam district